North Salem is a section of the town of Salem in Rockingham County, New Hampshire, United States. It occupies the northernmost portion of the town and is located at the northern end of Arlington Mill Reservoir. Although there are some shops and other  businesses, it is mostly a residential area.

The community is bypassed by New Hampshire Route 111, which travels northeast to Hampstead and Kingston, and southwest to Windham and Hudson.

North Salem has a separate ZIP code (03073, P.O. boxes only) from other areas in the town of Salem.

Sites of interest
America's Stonehenge, located just east of the center of North Salem

References

Unincorporated communities in Rockingham County, New Hampshire
Unincorporated communities in New Hampshire